The Cahitan languages is a branch of the Uto-Aztecan language family that comprises the Yaqui and the Mayo languages, both of Northern Mexico. The branch has been considered to be part of the Taracahitic languages, but this is no longer considered a valid genetic unit.

References

Cáhita
Indigenous languages of California
Southern Uto-Aztecan languages